Beth Krom (née Weinstein, born 1958) is a former Irvine, California City Councilmember and was twice elected Mayor of Irvine, as a Democrat. Krom received a B.S. in Education from the University of Texas, Austin.

Krom, the daughter of news anchor Irv Weinstein. was born in Buffalo and attended P.S. 81 in North Buffalo through second grade.  In 1965, her family moved to the nearby suburb of Kenmore, New York where Beth attended Lindbergh Elementary, Kenmore Junior High and Kenmore West High School.

Politics
In 2000 Beth Krom first ran for public office as a candidate for City Council. Out of a field of eleven candidates, she came in third, winning a two-year term. In 2002, she won re-election to the City Council as the top vote-getter and in 2004 she won her first term as Mayor of Irvine. In 2006, Beth Krom was re-elected with almost 60% of the vote, the largest margin of victory for any Mayor in a competitive race to that point in the city’s history.
 
During her term as Mayor, Irvine was recognized as the Safest Big City in America four years in a row and earned recognition as one of the “100 Best Communities for Young People” twice. In addition, the city’s “rainy day reserves” were tripled to more than $30 million during her term.  Krom and fellow council member, Larry Agran, led the fight to defeat a plan to turn the abandoned El Toro Marine Corps base into a commercial airport.  That land is now the site of the Orange County Great Park, as well as residential housing.

In 2006, Beth Krom was invited to give a commencement address at the University of California, Irvine for the combined schools of Education, Fine Arts and Physical Sciences.

In 2008, with term limits preventing her from running for a third term as Mayor, Beth Krom was again elected to the Irvine City Council, earning the first place spot with a lead of more than 8000 votes over the second-place finisher.

2010 U.S. House campaign

In March 2009, Krom announced her plans to run for Congress in California's 48th congressional district. Her campaign embraced a "Mrs. Krom Goes to Washington" theme to reinforce the importance of engaging people in the democratic process. She was defeated by incumbent Republican John B. T. Campbell III.

2016 temporary Mayor of Irvine

In December 2016, Krom was voted in as temporary Mayor by the Irvine City Council to fill Steven Choi's vacated seat.

References

External links

 About -  Beth Krom - official website

1958 births
Living people
Mayors of Irvine, California
Politicians from Buffalo, New York
University of Texas at Austin College of Education alumni
California city council members
Women city councillors in California
Women mayors of places in California
California Democrats
People from Kenmore, New York
21st-century American women